IRQ may refer to:

 Interrupt request, a computer hardware signal
 Iraq (ISO 3166-1 country code)
 Qeshm Air (ICAO airline designator)